Otherworld, such as the Celtic Otherworld, is a concept in religion that refers to other worlds such as the home of the deities or spirits or a realm of the dead.

Otherworld may also refer to:

Books and comics
Otherworld (DC comics), a 2005 comics miniseries by Phil Jimenez
Otherworld, a name for Avalon (Marvel Comics), a realm featured in Marvel Comics
 Women of the Otherworld, an urban fantasy series by Kelley Armstrong
 Otherworld, an urban fantasy series of novels by Yasmine Galenorn
 Otherworld, a young adult science fiction novel by Jason Segel and Kirsten Miller

Film and television
Otherworld (TV series), a 1985 American television series
Otherworld, English title of Y Mabinogi, a 2003 Welsh film
Otherworld, a dimension in the Dragon Ball series.

Music
Otherworld (album), a 1999 album by Lúnasa
"Otherworld", a song on the 2000 Magica (album) by Dio
"Otherworld", a 2001 song from Final Fantasy X Original Soundtrack
"Otherworld", a song on the 2010 album Everything Remains (As It Never Was) by Eluveitie

Video games
 Otherworld, a location in the video game Omori

See also
Another World (disambiguation)
Different World (disambiguation)
Other Worlds (disambiguation)